Gathering Speed is the fourth studio album of the English progressive rock band, Big Big Train. It was released in 2004 by Treefrog Records. It is dedicated to the airmen and women who lost their lives in the Battle of Britain. The song The Road Much Further On was originally titled You Can't Draw Love. It was inspired by Spawton's then seven-year-old daughter. The album as a whole was a return to progressive rock for the band. It is the first album in which Sean Filkins recorded vocals, replacing Martin Read. It is also the only album in which Laura Murch recorded vocals, and the only Big Big Train album not to feature any songs solely written by Greg Spawton.

Track listing

Personnel
Ian Cooper - keyboards
Sean Filkins - lead vocals, blues harp, percussion
Steve Hughes - drums, percussion
Andy Poole - bass
Gregory Spawton - guitars, additional keyboards, backing vocals

Guest musicians
Laura Murch - vocals

References

External links
 
 

Big Big Train albums
2004 albums